The Parc Linéaire Le P'tit Train du Nord is a multiuse recreational rail trail located in Quebec, Canada. It runs through the Rivière du Nord valley. It originally was a railway line operated by Canadian Pacific Railway which operated it at a continuous financial loss since its construction in the 1890s. During the 1990s, it was dismantled to make way for a recreational multi-use trail except for the portion between Montréal and Saint-Jérôme which is still in service as the Saint-Jérôme line. Prior to decommissioning, passenger traffic on this line was so scarce that it gave way to the humorous and intricately philosophical and poetic song by Felix Leclerc, "Le train du nord".

Le P'tit Train du Nord linear park is a regional recreational and touristic asset for the Laurentian which offers its own residents access to high-quality transportation and leisure activities on the one hand as well as allowing for management of a major tourist attraction generating significant economic benefits for the region on the other.

See also
 Laurentides
 List of rail trails
 List of rail trails in Canada

References

External links
 
 "Easy Slopes, Please: Biking the Mountains of Quebec" by Julia Lawlor, The New York Times, July 13, 2007
 Detailed Google map

Geography of Laurentides
Rail trails in Quebec
Transport in Laurentides
Tourist attractions in Laurentides
1990s establishments in Quebec
Linear parks